The 1924 Campeonato Paulista was the 23rd season of São Paulo's top association football league. The edition organized by the APEA (Associação Paulista de Esportes Atléticos) from April 20, 1924, to January 18, 1925. The top scorer was Feitiço with 14 goals.

System
The championship was disputed in two rounds. The first is a single round-robin system, classifying the eight better placed teams. Into the second round, another round-robin, with the team with the most points winning the title.

Championship

References

Campeonato Paulista seasons
Paulista